Sagephora jocularis is a species of moth in the family Tineidae. It was described by Alfred Philpott in 1926. This species is endemic to New Zealand and has been collected in Canterbury and Southland. Adults are on the wing in January and October.

Taxonomy
This species was first described by Alfred Philpott using a specimen collected at Tisbury in Southland and named Sagephora jocularis. In 1928 George Hudson discussed and illustrated this species. The male holotype specimen is held in the New Zealand Arthropod Collection.

Description

Philpott described this species as follows:

Distribution
This species is endemic to New Zealand. Specimens have been collected at the type locality of Tisbury, as well as Purau and Dyer's Pass in Canterbury.

Behaviour
This species is on the wing in January and October.

Reference

Moths described in 1926
Tineidae
Moths of New Zealand
Endemic fauna of New Zealand
Taxa named by Alfred Philpott
Endemic moths of New Zealand